Rodolfo Esteban Cardoso (born 17 October 1968) is an Argentine former football midfielder who spent the majority of his playing career in Germany. He was head coach of the reserve team of Hamburger SV between 2008 and 2014. He was most recently the assistant coach of Hamburger SV.

Club career
Born in Azul, Cardoso started his professional playing career in 1987 with Estudiantes de La Plata. In 1989, he was signed by German side FC Homburg. He went on to play for SC Freiburg and Werder Bremen before joining Hamburger SV in 1997.

Between 1998 and 1999, he returned to Argentina on loan to Boca Juniors and then Estudiantes de La Plata. He returned to Germany in 1999 and continued playing for the club until his retirement in 2004.

International career
In 1997 Cardoso was selected to join the Argentina squad for Copa América.

Coaching career
Cardoso became head coach of Hamburger SV II on 18 December 2008 after Karsten Bäron and his assistant coach Frank Pieper were dismissed. Cardoso became assistant coach of the first team on 14 March 2011. He returned to the reserve team on 1 July 2011 only to return to the first team as interim head coach on 19 September 2011 when Michael Oenning was sacked. Cardoso, who didn't have the appropriate coaching licence, wasn't allowed to continue in his role as interim head coach and was relegated to assistant coach on 11 October 2011. Frank Arnesen took over as interim head coach. He returned to the reserve team on 17 October 2011. He was in that position until he was once again interim head coach of the first team from 17 September 2013 until 24 September 2013 when Bert van Marwijk was hired as the new head coach. He returned to the position until the end of the 2013–14 season. On 31 March 2015, he returned to the reserve team of Hamburg. He became the third coach of the season.

Cardoso left Hamburger SV on 12 March 2018.

Coaching record

Honours
Hamburger SV
DFL-Ligapokal: 2003

References

External links
 
 Rodolfo Esteban Cardoso's Argentine Primera statistics 

1967 births
Living people
Sportspeople from Buenos Aires Province
Argentine footballers
Argentina international footballers
Argentine expatriate footballers
1997 Copa América players
Association football midfielders
Estudiantes de La Plata footballers
Boca Juniors footballers
FC 08 Homburg players
SC Freiburg players
SV Werder Bremen players
Hamburger SV players
Argentine Primera División players
Bundesliga players
2. Bundesliga players
Expatriate footballers in Germany
Argentine expatriate sportspeople in Germany
Argentine expatriate football managers